Josh Segarra (born June 3, 1986) is an American actor. He is known for his roles on the television series The Electric Company, Sirens, and Arrow as well as for originating the role of Emilio Estefan in the musical On Your Feet!. His other television credits include Chicago P.D., The Other Two, Orange Is the New Black, and She-Hulk: Attorney at Law, while his other theatrical credits include the musicals Lysistrata Jones and Dogfight, and the slasher horror film Scream VI.

Early life
Segarra was born on June 3, 1986, in Longwood, Florida. He is of Puerto Rican descent, and is fluent in Spanish. He learned to sing in his Pentecostal church but aspired to be a professional wrestler. Segarra is a graduate of NYU's Tisch School of the Arts.

Career
From 2009 to 2011, Segarra portrayed a main role of Hector Ruiz on the PBS Kids Go television series The Electric Company. He then originated the role of Mick in the musical Lysistrata Jones. In May 2012, Segarra was announced as a cast member for the Off-Broadway world premiere of Dogfight, a musical adaptation of the film of the same name, with music and lyrics by Benj Pasek and Justin Paul and a book by Peter Duchan. The musical opened at the Tony Kiser Theater at Second Stage Theater on July 16, 2012.

Two years later, he recurred during the first season of the comedy television series Sirens, after which he was promoted to a series regular during its second season. Segarra then began a recurring role on the NBC police procedural drama Chicago P.D. He also appeared in the 2015 comedy film Trainwreck. Segarra originated the role of Emilio Estefan in the musical On Your Feet!, which opened at the Marquis Theater on Broadway on November 5, 2015. His final performance took place on July 10, 2016. Following his final appearance on Chicago P.D. in May 2016, Segarra was cast as a series regular on the CW superhero television series Arrow for its fifth season. He portrayed the series' adaptation of the comic book character Adrian Chase. He then returned in a guest starring capacity during the series' sixth and eighth seasons.

Since January 2019, Segarra has been a recurring cast member on The Other Two, a comedy television series on Comedy Central. In December, he recurred on The Moodys as Marco, a "commodities broker with exquisite phone skills." He also starred in the Netflix comedy series AJ and the Queen, which premiered on January 10, 2020. That same year, Segarra appeared as a special agent during the third season of the crime drama series FBI and starred as a pastor in the musical film Christmas on the Square. He is set to portray Teddy Walker in the upcoming NBC comedy pilot Night School, which is based on the 2018 film of the same name. In July 2021, he was cast in the Disney+ superhero series She-Hulk: Attorney at Law. 

In June 2022, it was announced that Segarra had joined the cast of the slasher sequel Scream VI, the sixth installment in the Scream series which was released on March 10 2023.

Personal life
Segarra married longtime girlfriend Brace Rice on October 17, 2014. The couple welcomed their first child, a son, on September 30, 2016, which was followed by the birth of their second child, a son, on January 8, 2020. He and his wife are both sports fans.

Filmography

Film

Television

Theatre

Video games

References

External links
 
 
 

1986 births
Living people
21st-century American male actors
American male film actors
American male stage actors
American male television actors
American male voice actors
American people of Catalan descent
American people of Puerto Rican descent
Lake Brantley High School alumni
People from Orlando, Florida